Kirayi Kotigadu is a 1983 Indian Telugu action drama film starring Krishna and Sridevi. The film was directed by A. Kodandarami Reddy who also wrote the screenplay while the story was provided by Satyamurthy. Chakravarthy scored and composed the film's soundtrack. Rao Gopala Rao, Allu Ramalingaiah and Giribabu play supporting characters.

The story revolves around two notorious landlords who hire a ruthless and money-minded ruffian, Kotigadu, to deal with Rambabu, a military officer, who leads the villagers in a rebellion against the duo's atrocious activities. Though he heavily injures Ramu, the latter and Gauri, a village girl, discovers the good side of Kotigadu and decides to redeem him thereby pitting him against the landlords.

The film released on 17 March to good reviews and  turned out to be a money spinner. The film became noted for the introduction scene of the protagonist Kotigadu, played by Krishna. Owing to the major success of the film, the director collaborated with Krishna for another film titled Ramarajyamlo Bheemaraju (1983) which was released in the same year to positive response.

Cast 
 Krishna
 Sridevi
 Rao Gopala Rao as Adiseshayya
 Allu Ramalingaiah as Garudachalam
 Sridhar as Rambabu
 Giribabu
 Jayamalini

Release and reception 
The film was released on 17 March 1983 to generally positive reviews.
The film was declared a success at the box office.

Soundtrack 
The music was composed by Chakravarthy and all songs were penned by Veturi Sundararama Murthy.

Reference

External links 

1983 films
Indian action films
1980s masala films
Films directed by A. Kodandarami Reddy
Films scored by K. Chakravarthy
1983 action films
1980s Telugu-language films